Haplochrois buvati is a species of moth of the family Elachistidae. It is found in south-western Europe.

The wingspan is 13–18 mm. Adults have been recorded from mid-August to mid-October.

The food plant is unknown.

References

External links
Lepiforum e. V.

Moths described in 1985
Elachistidae
Moths of Europe